Straning-Grafenberg is a municipality in the district of Horn in Lower Austria, Austria.

Geography
Straning-Grafenberg lies on the border between the Weinviertel and the Waldviertel in Lower Austria. About 7.5 percent of the municipality is forested.

References

Cities and towns in Horn District